A fais do-do is a Cajun dance party; the term originated before World War II.

History
According to Mark Humphrey, the parties were named for "the gentle command ('go to sleep') young mothers offered bawling infants."  He quotes early Cajun musician Edwin Duhon of the Hackberry Ramblers: 
 "She'd go to the cry room, give the baby a nipple and say, 'Fais do-do.' She'd want the baby to go to sleep fast, 'cause she's worried about her husband dancing with somebody else out there."
 
"Do-do" itself is a hypocoristic shortening of the French verb dormir (to sleep), used primarily in speaking to small children. The phrase is embodied in an old French lullaby, a song sung to children when putting them down for the night.

Joshua Caffery, however, suggests the true derivation is more plausibly the dance call dos à dos (back to back), the do si do call of Anglo-American folk dance; and that sources such as Duhon are merely "repeating the same apocryphal explanation known by almost anyone who lives in Southern Louisiana."

Occurrences include the following:
 Dance temptation with back to back, or  dos à dos from Louisiana French.
 In Aaron Neville's 1993 "Louisiana Christmas Day"
 A mention in  Brenda Lee's 1958 song "Papa Noel", on the B-side of "Rockin' Around the Christmas Tree"
 In the lyrics of Bayou Jubilee, by The Nitty Gritty Dirt Band, on the album, Dream. "Nothing in this world, such a pure delight, as a fais-do-do on a Saturday night."
 In the lyrics of "Diggy Liggy Lo" song and lyrics written by Terry J. Clement.
 In the 1989 film J'ai Été Au Bal/I Went to the Dance by Les Blank, Chris Strachwitz, Maureen Gosling.
 In the 1944 film Dark Waters starring Merle Oberon.
 In the Landry series by V.C. Andrews
 In the lyrics of "Down At The Twist And Shout" by Mary Chapin Carpenter.

See also
 Swamp pop
 Swamp blues
 Zydeco
 Cajun music
 Cajun
 Tejano music

References

External links
  "Fais do"  (1998–2010)
 "Mama Lisa’s World :Children's Songs and Nursery Rhymes", Lisa Yannucci (2010)

Cajun dance
Parties